Aethiopodes is a genus in the geometer moth family (Geometridae). Sometimes included in Odontopera, other authors treat it as distinct. If valid, it is a small genus with just about 10 species from southern Africa.

Species include:
 Aethiopodes indecoraria Walker, 1866
 Aethiopodes perplexata
 Aethiopodes saxeticola Krüger, 2005
 Aethiopodes staudei

Footnotes

References
  (2005): New species of geometrid moths from Lesotho (Lepidoptera: Geometroidea: Geometridae). Annals of the Transvaal Museum 42: 19-45. HTML abstract
  (2004): Butterflies and Moths of the World, Generic Names and their Type-species – Parectropis. Version of 2004-NOV-05. Retrieved 2011-APR-21.

Ennominae
Geometridae genera